Alain Ferry (born 3 February 1952) is a French politician. A member of the Radical Party, he represented the 6th constituency of the Bas-Rhin in the National Assembly for over 19 years, from 2 April 1993 to 19 June 2012. He has been the mayor of Wisches in the Bas-Rhin since 1989 and was a member of the General Council of the département from 1992 to 2004.

He is the founding President of the Alsace-Moselle Memorial museum.

References

1952 births
Deputies of the 12th National Assembly of the French Fifth Republic
Deputies of the 13th National Assembly of the French Fifth Republic
Living people
Mayors of places in Grand Est
People from Baden-Baden
Radical Party (France) politicians
Union for a Popular Movement politicians